Kim Sung-hoon (born 1974) is a South Korean film director debuted with the musical drama film My Little Hero (2013). His second feature was the fast-paced action film Confidential Assignment (2017) which starred Hyun Bin. A box office hit with more than 7.8 million admissions and grossing over US$56.4 million, the film was sold to 42 territories, including the U.S., the Middle East, India, the Philippines and Mongolia.

Filmography 
Love (1999) - assistant director
My Little Hero (2013) - director
Confidential Assignment (2017) - director
Rampant (2018) - director

Awards and nominations

References

External links 
 
 
 

1974 births
Living people
South Korean film directors